Thoppil Mohamed Meeran (26 September 1944 – 10 May 2019) was an Indian Nagercoil based author who wrote in Tamil.

Meeran was awarded the highest Indian Government award for Literature, Sahitya Akademi Award in 1997 for his novel Saivu Narkali (The Reclining Chair). He also received the Tamil Nadu Kalai Ilakkiya Perumantam Award, the Ilakkiya Chintanai Award, and the T N Govt. Award. He published six novels and seven short story collections.

Personal life
Mohamed Meeran was born in Nagercoil. He was also addressed as Thoppil Meeran by his friends and family. His father's name is Mohammed Abdul Khader (முஹம்மது  அப்துல் காதர் ) and his mother's name is Beevi Paatha Kannu (பீவி  பாத்த கண்ணு ). He was married to Jaleela and had two children, Shameem Ahamed and Mirzad Ahamed. He hailed from a village named Thengai Pattanam which is part of the Kanyakumari District, Tamil Nadu. He was one of the sons of the famous M.O.M Family. On 10 May 2019 he died due to the ill health at Tirunelveli.

Works

Novels
Oru Kadalora Kiramathin Kathai (1988, The Story of Sea Side Village)
Turaimugam (1991, Harbour)
Koonan Thoppu (1993, The Grove of a Hunchback)
Saivu Narkkali (1995, The Reclining Chair)
Anju vannam theru (2011, "Five Colours street")
kudiyetram (2017, Emigration)

Short story collections
Anbuku Muthumai Illai
Thankarasu(1995)
Anathasainam Colony
Oru kutty thevin varipadam
Thoppil mohammed meeran kathaigal
Oru maaamaramum konjam paravaigalum
Maranathin meethu urulum sakkaram

Anthology
varekalin pechu

Translations
Husainul jamal (moin kutty vaither)
Theivathin kanne (NP Mohammed) 
vaikom muhammad basheer valkai varalaru (mona graph) (MN karassery)  
Thirukottiyur kurunavel (U.A Kader)
Meesan karkalin kaval  (Pk Parakadavu)

Awards
Tamil Nadu Kalai Ilakkiya Perumantam (1992)
Ilakkiya Chintanai
Lilly Devasigamani
T N Govt. Award
Amuthan adigal Literary award
TN Murpokku Ezhuthalar Sangam
Sahitya Akademi Award (1997)
SRM University Tamil Academy Award 'Pudumaipiththan Creative Literature Award for the best small stories Novels and Drama (2012)'

References

People from Kanyakumari district
1944 births
Tamil writers
2019 deaths
Recipients of the Sahitya Akademi Award in Tamil